

Peerage of England

|rowspan="2"|Earl of Surrey (1088)||William de Warenne, 5th Earl of Surrey||1199||1240||Died
|-
|John de Warenne, 6th Earl of Surrey||1240||1304||
|-
|rowspan="2"|Earl of Warwick (1088)||Thomas de Beaumont, 6th Earl of Warwick||1229||1242||Died
|-
|Margaret de Newburg, 7th Countess of Warwick||1242||1253||
|-
|Earl of Leicester (1107)||Simon de Montfort, 6th Earl of Leicester||1218||1265|| 
|-
|Earl of Gloucester (1122)||Richard de Clare, 6th Earl of Gloucester||1230||1262||5th Earl of Hertford
|-
|rowspan="2"|Earl of Arundel (1138)||Hugh d'Aubigny, 5th Earl of Arundel||1224||1243||Died
|-
|John FitzAlan, 6th Earl of Arundel||1243||1267||
|-
|rowspan="2"|Earl of Derby (1138)||William de Ferrers, 4th Earl of Derby||1190||1247||Died
|-
|William de Ferrers, 5th Earl of Derby||1247||1254||
|-
|Earl of Norfolk (1140)||Roger Bigod, 4th Earl of Norfolk||1225||1270||
|-
|rowspan="2"|Earl of Devon (1141)||Baldwin de Redvers, 6th Earl of Devon||1217||1245||Died
|-
|Baldwin de Redvers, 7th Earl of Devon||1245||1262||
|-
|Earl of Oxford (1142)||Hugh de Vere, 4th Earl of Oxford||1221||1263||
|-
|Earl of Salisbury (1145)||Ela of Salisbury, 3rd Countess of Salisbury||1196||1261||
|-
|rowspan="3"|Earl of Pembroke (1189)||Gilbert Marshal, 4th Earl of Pembroke||1234||1241||Died
|-
|Walter Marshal, 5th Earl of Pembroke||1241||1245||Died
|-
|Anselm Marshal, 6th Earl of Pembroke||1245||1245||Died, title became extinct
|-
|Earl of Hereford (1199)||Humphrey de Bohun, 2nd Earl of Hereford||1220||1275||1st Earl of Essex (1239)
|-
|Earl of Winchester (1207)||Roger de Quincy, 2nd Earl of Winchester||1219||1264||
|-
|Earl of Lincoln (1217)||Margaret de Quincy, Countess of Lincoln||1232||1266||
|-
|Earl of Cornwall (1225)||Richard, 1st Earl of Cornwall||1225||1272||
|-
|Earl of Kent (1227)||Hubert de Burgh, 1st Earl of Kent||1227||1243||Died, title became extinct
|-
|Earl of Richmond (1241)||Peter of Savoy, 1st Earl of Richmond||1241||1268||New creation
|-
|Earl of Pembroke (1247)||William de Valence, 1st Earl of Pembroke||1247||1296||New creation

Peerage of Scotland

|rowspan=2|Earl of Mar (1114)||Donnchadh, Earl of Mar||Abt. 1220||Abt. 1240||Died
|-
|Uilleam, Earl of Mar||Abt. 1240||1281||
|-
|rowspan=2|Earl of Dunbar (1115)||Patrick II, Earl of Dunbar||1232||1248||Died
|-
|Patrick III, Earl of Dunbar||1248||1289||
|-
|rowspan=3|Earl of Angus (1115)||Máel Coluim, Earl of Angus||1214||1240||Died
|-
|Matilda, Countess of Angus||1240||1246||Died
|-
|Gilbert de Umfraville, Earl of Angus||1246||1307||
|-
|rowspan=2|Earl of Atholl (1115)||Padraig, Earl of Atholl||Abt. 1231||1241||Died
|-
|Forbhlaith, Countess of Atholl||1241||Abt. 1250||
|-
|rowspan=2|Earl of Buchan (1115)||Margaret, Countess of Buchan||Abt. 1195||Abt. 1243||Died
|-
|Alexander Comyn, Earl of Buchan||Abt. 1243||1289||
|-
|rowspan=2|Earl of Strathearn (1115)||Robert, Earl of Strathearn||1223||1245||Died
|-
|Maol Íosa II, Earl of Strathearn||1245||1271||
|-
|Earl of Fife (1129)||Máel Coluim II, Earl of Fife||1228||1266||
|-
|Earl of Menteith (1160)||Isabella, Countess of Menteith||Abt. 1230||1258||
|-
|Earl of Lennox (1184)||Maol Domhnaich, Earl of Lennox||1220||1260||
|-
|Earl of Carrick (1184)||Donnchadh, Earl of Carrick||1186||1250||
|-
|Earl of Ross (1215)||Fearchar, Earl of Ross||1215||1251||
|-
|rowspan=2|Earl of Sutherland (1235)||William de Moravia, 1st Earl of Sutherland||1235||1248||Died
|-
|William de Moravia, 2nd Earl of Sutherland||1248||1307||
|-
|}

Peerage of Ireland

|Earl of Ulster (1205)||Hugh de Lacy, 1st Earl of Ulster||1205||1242||Died, title extinct
|-
|rowspan=2|Baron Athenry (1172)||Peter de Bermingham||1218||1244||Died
|-
|Meyler de Bermingham||1244||1262||
|-
|Baron Kingsale (1223)||Patrick de Courcy, 2nd Baron Kingsale||1230||1260||
|-
|Baron Kerry (1223)||Thomas Fitzmaurice, 1st Baron Kerry||1223||1260||
|-
|}

References

 

Lists of peers by decade
1240s in England
1240s in Ireland
13th century in Scotland
13th-century English people
13th-century Irish people
13th-century mormaers
Peers